In military terms, 1st Regiment or 1st Infantry Regiment may refer to:

Australia 
1st Regiment, Royal Australian Artillery
1st Aviation Regiment (Australia)

France 
 1st Marine Infantry Regiment
 1st Infantry Regiment (France)

Germany 
Jäger Regiment 1 (Bundeswehr)
1st Foot Guards (German Empire)
1st (Emperor Alexander) Guards Grenadiers
1st (1st East Prussian) Grenadiers "Crown Prince"
SS Fortress Regiment 1

Greece 
1st Infantry Regiment (Greece)
1st Evzone Regiment
1st Raider Regiment (Greece), see 3rd Special Forces Division
1st Serres Regiment

Poland 
1st Aviation Regiment (Poland)

Spain
1st King's Immemorial Infantry Regiment

South Africa 
Durban Light Infantry, formerly 1st Infantry (Durban Light Infantry)

Thailand
1st Infantry Regiment, King's Own Bodyguards

United Kingdom 
1st (Royal) Regiment of Foot
1st Regiment of Foot Guards
1st Regiment Greek Light Infantry
1 Regiment RLC, a unit of the Royal Logistic Corps
1 Regiment Army Air Corps

United States 
1st Infantry Regiment (United States)
1st Marine Regiment (United States)
First Regiment Massachusetts Volunteer Infantry, a unit in the American Civil War
1st Aviation Regiment (United States)

Yugoslavia 
1st Fighter Regiment
1st Yugoslav Fighter Regiment
1st Transport Aviation Regiment
1st Training Aviation Regiment
1st Air Reconnaissance Regiment

See also
 1st Cavalry Regiment (disambiguation)
 1st Division (disambiguation)